Neoregelia longisepala is a species in the genus Neoregelia. This species is endemic to Brazil. It is the only species in Neoregelia subgenus Protoregelia.

References

longisepala
Flora of Brazil